Fata Salkunič is a currently unattached Slovenian football midfielder, currently playing for USV Jena in the German Bundesliga. She previously played for ZNK Maribor and Krka Novo Mesto in the Slovenian League, Hamburger SV in the Bundesliga and FC Basel in the Swiss Nationalliga A.

She is a member of the Slovenian national team.

References

External links
 

1991 births
Living people
Footballers from Ljubljana
Slovenian women's footballers
Slovenian expatriate sportspeople in Germany
Expatriate footballers in Germany
FF USV Jena players
Slovenia women's international footballers
Slovenian expatriate sportspeople in Switzerland
Women's association football midfielders
ŽNK MB Tabor players
ŽNK Krka players